Jet Set Sports LLC, d/b/a CoSport, is a distributor of consumer hospitality packages and tickets to the Olympic games. It is a privately-held company established in 2000 and owned by Sead Dizdarevic. CoSport has the rights to market and sell consumer hospitality and premium ticket packages, individual tickets and hospitality management services in Australia, Austria, Bulgaria, Canada, Jordan, Norway, Sweden, the United States, and other EU/EEA countries such as Croatia and Greece.

CoSport is a part of Jet Set Sports, which was founded in its original form in 1975 and first provided hospitality services to the Olympics in 1984, and is one of the leading providers of VIP and corporate Olympic hospitality packages.

In March 2021, CoSport announced that people who purchased tickets for the Tokyo 2020 Olympics from the company would not be refunded the 20% service fee, with Alan Dizdarevic saying "There's nothing to give back of the 20%, because it's all been spent."

References

Ticket sales companies
Companies based in Somerset County, New Jersey
2000 establishments in the United States